Nebria psammophila is a species of ground beetle from the Nebriinae subfamily that can be found in Kashmir, Kazakhstan, Kyrgyzstan, Nepal, Tajikistan, and Uzbekistan.

References

psammophila
Beetles described in 1874
Beetles of Asia